Carrigaline GAA is a Gaelic Athletic Association club based in the town of Carrigaline in County Cork, Ireland. The club fields both Gaelic football and hurling teams in competitions organised by Cork County Board. The club is part of the Carrigdhoun division of Cork. They are a Senior Football club, and a Premier Intermediate Hurling club. Cork Inter-county player Nicholas Murphy plays his club football with Carrigaline. Despite competing in numerous county finals such as Intermediate football final of 2003 and Intermediate hurling of 2006, Carrigaline failed to capture a county title. This was until 12 October 2008 when they captured their first adult county after an Intermediate A Hurling win over Bandon. In 2009 they captured the football title, by beating Cill na Martra. In 2014 they secured their first top level county by defeating St. Finbarr's, in the Premier 1 Minor Football Final. In 2015 the club reached the Promised Land beating  St Michael's in the Cork Premier Intermediate Football Championship Final, on a scoreline of 0–12 to 0-11.

Honours
 Munster Intermediate Club Football Championship Runners-Up 2015
 Cork Premier Intermediate Football Championship Winners (1) 2015
 Cork Intermediate A Hurling Championship Winners (1) 2008 Runner-Up 1956, 1958, 2006
 Cork Intermediate A Football Championship Winners (1) 2009 Runners-Up 1996, 2003, 2007
 Cork Minor Hurling Championship Runners-Up 2005, 2016
 Cork Minor Football Championship Winners (1) 2014  Runners-Up 1995, 1996, 2008, 2016
 Cork Minor A Football Championship Runners-Up 2002
 Cork Premier Under-21 A Hurling Championship Runners-Up 2014, 2007
 Cork Under-21 Football Championship Runner-Up 2011
 Carrigdhoun Junior Hurling Championship - 10 titles. Winners 1926, 1935, 1938, 1944, 1947, 1974, 1982, 1983, 1990, 2003 Runners-Up 1937, 1945, 1981, 1985, 1989, 1991, 2002, 2011
 Carrigdhoun Junior Football Championship - 14 titles. Winners 1936, 1938, 1939, 1940, 1947, 1955, 1957, 1959, 1967, 1968, 1969, 1990, 1991, 1992 Runners-Up 1937, 1945, 1948, 1952, 1953, 1960, 1965, 1972, 1973, 1977, 1980, 1988, 1996
 Féile na nGael Division 2 Winners (1) 2002
 South-East Under 21"A" Hurling Championship Winners (7) 1982, 1988, 2007, 2011, 2013, 2014, 2022
 South-East Under 21 "A" Football Championship Winners (15) 1972, 1979, 1988, 1989, 1992, 1997, 1998, 2003, 2008, 2011, 2012, 2017, 2018, 2019, 2022
 South-East Under 21 "B" Football Championship Winners (2) 1995, 2010

Notable players

 David Griffin
 Nicholas Murphy 2004 All-Ireland Intermediate Hurling Championship winner, 2010 All-Ireland Senior Football Championship winner, 2006 All-Star
 David Drake 2014 All-Ireland Intermediate Hurling Championship winner
 Rob O'Shea
 Joe Moran
 Con Cooney
 Tony Murphy

References

External links
 Official Carrigaline GAA website 

Gaelic games clubs in County Cork
Gaelic football clubs in County Cork
Hurling clubs in County Cork